Coincidental Music is a 1985 solo album by Haruomi Hosono. It consists of a selection of soundtracks composed at the time for installations, commercials, TV, films, and for companies like Yakult and Shiseido. The album was re-released in 1996.

Track listing
 Lichtenstein's (0:31)
 Pietro Germi (5:30)
 Normandia (2:26)
 The Man Of China (1:50)
 Sayokoskatti (4:45)
 Mazinger "H" (3:14)
 The Plan (0:31)
 Nokto De La Galaksia Fervojo (1:31)
 George Don (1:01)
 Bio Philosophy (4:40)
 Memphis, Milano (10:27)

1985 albums
Haruomi Hosono albums